Leszek II can be referred to:

 Leszek II, legendary ruler of Poland
 Leszek II the Black, High Duke of Poland